Aglossa electalis is a species of snout moth in the genus Aglossa. It was described by George Duryea Hulst in 1866. It is found in California, United States.

The wingspan is about 27 mm.

References

Moths described in 1866
Pyralini
Moths of North America